Jan Tarło (died 1571/1572) was a Polish noble.

He was Chorąży of Lwów.

Married to Katarzyna Herburt-Odnowska and Regina z Malczyc.

16th-century births
1570s deaths
Jan (d. 1571)